The Samphire slender bluetongue (Cyclodomorphus melanops) is a species of lizard in the family Scincidae. The species is endemic to Australia.

References

Cyclodomorphus
Skinks of Australia
Reptiles described in 1893